The Melayu Kingdom (also known as Malayu, Dharmasraya Kingdom or the Jambi Kingdom; , reconstructed Middle Chinese pronunciation mat-la-yu kwok) was a classical Buddhist kingdom located in Southeast Asia.

The primary sources for much of the information on the kingdom are the New History of the Tang, and the memoirs of the Chinese Buddhist monk Yijing who visited in 671, and the state was "absorbed" by Srivijaya by 692, but had "broken away" by the end of the twelfth century according to Chao Jukua. The exact location of the kingdom is the subject of studies among historians. One theory is that the kingdom was established around present-day Jambi on Sumatra, Indonesia, approximately 300 km north of Palembang. According to this theory, it was founded by ethnic groups in the Batanghari river area and gold traders from the Minangkabau hinterland of Pagarruyung.

Etymology
There are different proposals for the origin of the word Melayu ('Malay'). One theory suggests that it is derived from the Javanese terms melayu or mlayu (to steadily accelerate or to run), to describe the strong current of a river in Sumatra that today bears the name Sungai Melayu ('Melayu river') which is the right branch going upriver of Batang Hari whose watershed reaches Pagarruyung. The name was later possibly adopted by the Melayu Kingdom, as it is common for people in the region to be known by the name of the river on which they settled. 

Another theory holds that it originated from the Tamil words Malai and ur meaning "mountain" and "city, land", respectively. It could possibly referred to Barisan Mountains, the mountain range in Sumatra. 

An early literary appearance where the word "Malayadvipa", which means "mountainous island", is described in chapter 48, Vayu Purana as one of the provinces in the eastern sea that was full of gold and silver. Some scholars equate the term with Sumatra, but several Indian scholars believe the term may refer to the peninsula, while Sumatra is more correctly associated with Suvarnadvipa (an ancient name referred to Sumatra) which means "The Gold Land" and the Barisan Mountains which is the mountainous range scattered from north to the south Sumatra hemisphere. Then, the term "Maleu-Kolon" was used in Geographia by Ptolemy which is believed to have originated from the Sanskrit term malayakolam or malaikurram, referring to a geographical part of peninsula. In 7th century, the first use of the term for a nation or a kingdom was recorded by Yijing.

The East Javanese Anjukladang inscription dated from 937 CE Mataram Kingdom stated that the Sima status was awarded to the Anjukladang village and a jayastambha (victory monument) was later upgraded to a temple, the monument was erected in recognition of their service on repelling the invading forces from Malayu. The temple mentioned here is probably the Candi Lor (made of bricks and now in ruins) located in Candirejo village in Nganjuk Regency. The mentioning of invading Malayu forces refers to the old term: "Sumatran Malayu Kingdom", which probably is thought to refer to Srivijaya instead. This means that by the 10th century, the Javanese identified their Sumatran-based enemy as "Malayu".

An inscription on the south wall of the 11th century Brihadeeswarar Temple also made a reference to Malaiyur, a kingdom that had "a strong mountain for its rampart" during the Chola invasion of Srivijaya period. This referred to Chola invaders during Rajendra Chola I's campaign.

In the later Yuan Dynasty (1271–1368) and Ming Dynasty (1368–1644), the word Ma-La-Yu was mentioned often in Chinese historical texts — with changes in spelling due to the time span between the dynasties — to refer to a nation near the southern sea. Among the terms used was "Bok-la-yu", "Mok-la-yu" (木剌由), Ma-li-yu-er (麻里予兒), Oo-lai-yu (巫来由 — traced from the written source of monk Xuanzang), and Wu-lai-yu (無来由). In the chronicle of Yuan Dynasty, the word "Ma-li-yu-er" was mentioned in describing the Sukhothai's southward expansion against Malayu:

In response to the Sukhothai's move, a Chinese envoy arrived at the Ram Khamhaeng's court in 1295 bearing an imperial order: "Keep your promise and do no evil to Ma-li-yu-er". This nation of "Ma-li-yu-er" that appeared in the Chinese record may also be the nation that was mentioned by the famous Venetian traveller Marco Polo (1254–1324) who lived during the same period. In Travels of Marco Polo, he made a reference to a kingdom named "Malauir" in the Malay peninsula.

The word bhūmi Mālayu (literally "Land of Malayu") is inscribed on the Padang Roco Inscription, dated 1286, according to the inscription, bhūmi Mālayu is associated with the Dharmasraya kingdom. On the Amoghapasa inscription, dated 1347, the word Malayapura (literally "city of Malaya" or "kingdom of Malaya") was proclaimed by Adityawarman, again referring to Dharmasraya. The word "Melayu" is also mentioned in the Malay annals referring to a river in Sumatra:

{{cquote|"...Here now is the story of a city called Palembang in the land of Andelas. It was ruled by Demang Lebar Daun, a descendant of Raja Shulan, and its river was the Muara Tatang. In the upper reaches of the Muara Tatang was a river called Melayu, and on that river was a hill called Si-Guntang Mahameru..."}}

Yijing's account

On his route via Maritime Southeast Asia, Yijing visited Srivijaya twice where he stayed from 688 to 695, studying and translating the original texts in Sanskrit. Srivijaya appears to have been flourishing around the time of Yijing's visit, which he initially called "Bogha" during his first visit. At its greatest extent, the kingdom extended to Malayu, which seems to have been annexed or to have come spontaneously under the realm of Bogha prince. The whole country as well as the capital received the name "Sribogha" or Srivijaya. The change of the name Malayu to Sribogha is likely to have occurred before Yijing's time or during his stay there, for whenever he mentions Malayu by name, he added that "it is now changed to Sribogha".

The following extract from Yijing's work, A Record of Buddhist Practices Sent Home from the Southern Sea, further describes his route via Bogha and Malayu:

Further for the determination of the location of Sribogha-Malayu, Yijing furnishes the following:

Thus it can be inferred that the country of Sribogha covered the place lying on the equator, and the whole county therefore must have covered the north east side of Sumatra, from the southern shore of Malacca, to the city of Palembang, extending at least five degrees, having the equatorial line at about the centre of the kingdom.

According to Yijing, Hinayana Buddhism was predominantly adopted in Srivijaya, represented for the most part by the Mulasarvastivada school, however there were few Mahayanists in Malayu. Gold seems to have been abundant in the kingdom, where people used to offer the Buddha a lotus flower of gold and used golden jars. Moreover, people of the kingdom wear a type of long cloth and used fragrant oil.

Further, Melayu had accessed to gold producing areas in the hinterland of Sumatra. This slowly increased the prestige of Melayu which traded various local goods, including gold, with foreigners.

Center of Srivijaya

Between 1079 and 1088, Chinese records show that Srivijaya sent ambassadors from Jambi and Palembang. In 1079 in particular, an ambassador from Jambi and Palembang each visited China. Jambi sent two more ambassadors to China in 1082 and 1088. This suggests that the centre of Srivijaya frequently shifted between the two major cities during that period. The Chola invasion of Srivijaya as well as changing trade routes weakened Palembang, allowing Jambi to take the leadership of Srivijaya from the 11th century on.

Demise
In 1275, Kertanegara, of the Singhasari Kingdom, took advantage of Srivijaya's decline and sent a military expedition to establish Javanese control of Melayu. Mahesa Anabrang (or Kebo/Lembu Anabrang) was a general of Singhasari, who conquered Srivijaya and Melayu in 1288. Embassies were sent to China in 1299 and 1301.

This event was likely recorded in a semi-legendary account of the Minangkabau legend. It was mentioned that the Javanese force was defeated in a buffalo fight. It was approximately at this point that the natives call themselves MinangKabau'' (victorious buffalo).

Almost a century after taking over the role of Palembang as the centre of an empire, Jambi and Srivijaya experienced a decline in influence. This was caused by a change of policy by the Song dynasty to no longer accept ambassadors from Srivijaya, and Jambi's inability to cope with the changing scenario. Instead of Jambi controlling the trade through a tributary system, traders were allowed to trade directly.

According to George Coedes, by the beginning of the fourteenth century, Melayu "remained the only Sumatran state of some political importance and it had become the refuge of Indian culture in opposition to the sultanates of the north that were already Islamized or in the process of becoming so".

Melayu's last prince Parameswara 
In the year 1347, Tribhuwana Wijayatunggadewi, the Queen of Majapahit, delegated Adityawarman as the ruler of Melayu to prevent the revival of Srivijaya. Adityawarman later conquered Tanah Datar to take control of the gold trade and founded a kingdom in Pagaruyung. In the year 1377, the Majapahit defeated Palembang and ended efforts to revive Srivijaya. The last prince of Srivijayan origin, Parameswara (thought to be the same person as Iskandar Shah in the Malay Annals), fled to Temasik to seek refuge before moving farther north, where he founded what would become the Malacca Sultanate.

See also
 Pamalayu expedition
 Dharmasraya

References

External links
 Photos of ancient Melayu Kingdom
 The History of Jambi - The Early history
 Timeline of Indonesia history
 Indonesia…from ancient times to middle ages
 The origins of the word 'Melayu'
 Memartabatkan dan Menyatukan Dunia Melayu 'Melayu'

Srivijaya
Hindu Buddhist states in Indonesia
Precolonial states of Indonesia
Malay kingdoms
7th century in Indonesia